The irregular bones are bones which, from their peculiar form, cannot be grouped as long, short, flat or sesamoid bones. Irregular bones serve various purposes in the body, such as protection of nervous tissue (such as the vertebrae protect the spinal cord), affording multiple anchor points for skeletal muscle attachment (as with the sacrum), and maintaining pharynx and trachea support, and tongue attachment (such as the hyoid bone). They consist of cancellous tissue enclosed within a thin layer of compact bone. Irregular bones can also be used for joining all parts of the spinal column together. The spine is the place in the human body where the most irregular bones can be found. There are, in all, 33 irregular bones found here.

The irregular bones are: the vertebrae, sacrum,  coccyx, temporal, sphenoid, ethmoid, zygomatic, maxilla, mandible, palatine, inferior nasal concha, and hyoid.

Additional images

References

Stedman's Online Medical Dictionary, 27th Edition